Galinha Pintadinha, (English translation: Little Dappled Chicken) also known in English-speaking territories as "Lottie Dottie Chicken" is a Brazilian project for children's music, created by Juliano Prado and Marcos Luporini, and animated by Bromelia Produções. The songs are originally in Portuguese and are getting millions of views on YouTube. Some of the songs have been translated into Spanish and English.

History
The songs revolve around the title character Galinha Pintadinha, a cartoon chicken and her friends from nursery rhymes, in animated music videos made in flash animation. They were phenomena in DVD sales during the early 2010s to be released and publicized nationally by Som Livre becoming well known among children with clowns Patati Patatá.
Also released several products based on the characters as toys, books and apps for smartphones. 
According to Associação Brasileira dos Produtores de Discos, the second DVD was the 6th biggest selling in 2010 DVD and 17th best-selling in 2011 in Brazil.

In 2013 the animated music videos premiered on Netflix in several countries including in the United States, Canada and Spanish Latin American countries. In 2015 its studio occupied the 89th position as one of the 150 biggest licensed brands in the world, ranking published by the British magazine License! Global.

In 2017 an animated webseries with full episodes called Galinha Pintadinha Mini was released on their own Youtube channel, separate from main channel. This webseries was later to the Netflix catalog, and also the TV channels TV Cultura and SBT.

Media
Since the release of their second album the character had a pretty big growth in children's media in Brazil. Many toys, backpacks, CDs, books and supplies for babies have been launched over the years. The characters also have achieved media for Smartphones with music applications and interactive games such as PoChickenPo.

International titles
 NOTE: Some of these might not be official names, but it might be unknown.
 United Kingdom, United States, and Canada: Lottie Dottie Chicken
 France: Poulette Petit Pois
 Spain: Gallina Pintadita
 Brazil and Portugal: Galinha Pintadinha
 Italy: Gallina Puntolina
 Germany: Kleine Henne Pünktchen
 Israel: Lottie Duti 
 Turkey: Renkli Tavuk
 India: Lottie Dottie Murgi
 Tanzania: Kuku Yenye Rangi
 Poland: Zauważył Niebieski Kurczak
 Japan:  ロッティードッティーチキン
 China: Lán sè gû

References

External links 
 
 Official YouTube Channel (Spanish)
 Official YouTube Channel (English)

Brazilian songs
Children's songs
Fictional chickens
Songs about birds
Songs about fictional female characters
Viral videos
Mass media franchises